Prionota is a genus of true crane fly.

Distribution
China, Indonesia, India & Sri Lanka.

Species
Subgenus Plocimas Enderlein, 1921
P. guangdongensis Yang & Young, 2007
P. magnifica (Enderlein, 1921)
P. serraticornis (Brunetti, 1911)
Subgenus Prionota van der Wulp, 1885
P. flaviceps (Enderlein, 1912)
P. nigriceps van der Wulp, 1885
P. seguyi Alexander, 1923
P. serrata (van der Wulp, 1885)
P. xanthomelana (Walker, 1848)

References

Tipulidae
Diptera of Asia